Nicholas Holman (born 29 May 1995) is a professional Australian rules footballer playing for the Gold Coast Football Club in the Australian Football League (AFL). He previously played for the Carlton Football Club from 2014 to 2017.

Early life
Holman played his junior football with Kyabram Football Club in the Goulburn Valley Football League, where he won a senior premiership in 2013, and played TAC Cup football for the Murray Bushrangers, where he was the vice-captain. He represented and was named the joint-most valuable player (MVP) of the Vic Country team at the 2013 AFL Under 18 Championships, playing as a midfielder.

AFL career
Holman was recruited by the Carlton Football Club with its third round selection, pick 51 overall, in the 2013 national draft. He spent most of the 2014 season playing with Carlton's , the Northern Blues, and he made his senior debut for Carlton against  in round 22, 2014.

After nine matches in two seasons, he was delisted at the conclusion of the 2015 season. He then made a move to the South Australian National Football League (SANFL) where he played for the Central District Football Club in 2016 and 2017.

After spending two seasons in the SANFL, Holman was recruited by the Gold Coast Suns in the 2018 rookie draft.

Statistics
 Statistics are correct to the end of round 2, 2022

|-
|- style="background-color: #EAEAEA"
! scope="row" style="text-align:center" | 2014
|style="text-align:center;"|
| 20 || 1 || 0 || 0 || 5 || 3 || 8 || 2 || 4 || 0.0 || 0.0 || 5.0 || 3.0 || 8.0 || 2.0 || 4.0
|-
! scope="row" style="text-align:center" | 2015
|style="text-align:center;"|
| 20 || 8 || 0 || 0 || 31 || 44 || 75 || 15 || 21 || 0.0 || 0.0 || 3.9 || 5.5 || 9.4 || 1.9 || 2.6
|- style="background-color: #EAEAEA"
! scope="row" style="text-align:center" | 2018
|style="text-align:center;"|
| 39 || 22 || 14 || 10 || 133 || 149 || 282 || 58 || 121 || 0.6 || 0.5 || 6.0 || 6.8 || 12.8 || 2.6 || 5.5
|-
! scope="row" style="text-align:center" | 2019
|style="text-align:center;"|
| 39 || 12 || 7 || 5 || 75 || 98 || 173 || 25 || 61 || 0.6 || 0.4 || 6.3 || 8.2 || 14.4 || 2.1 || 5.1
|- style="background-color: #EAEAEA"
! scope="row" style="text-align:center" | 2020
|style="text-align:center;"|
| 39 || 12 || 2 || 0 || 48 || 73 || 121 || 27 || 41 || 0.2 || 0.0 || 4.0 || 6.1 || 10.1 || 2.3 || 3.4
|-
! scope="row" style="text-align:center" | 2021
|style="text-align:center;"|
| 39 || 16 || 10 || 5 || 111 || 94 || 205 || 67 || 72 || 0.6 || 0.3 || 6.9 || 5.9 || 12.8 || 4.2 || 4.5
|- style="background-color: #EAEAEA"
! scope="row" style="text-align:center" | 2022
|style="text-align:center;"|
| 7 || 2 || 1 || 1 || 15 || 13 || 28 || 7 || 8 || 0.5 || 0.5 || 7.5 || 6.5 || 14.0 || 3.5 || 4.0
|-
|- class="sortbottom"
! colspan=3| Career
! 73
! 34
! 21
! 418
! 474
! 892
! 201
! 328
! 0.5
! 0.3
! 5.7
! 6.5
! 12.2
! 2.8
! 4.5
|}

Notes

References

External links

1995 births
Living people
Carlton Football Club players
Gold Coast Football Club players
Preston Football Club (VFA) players
Murray Bushrangers players
Kyabram Football Club players
Central District Football Club players
Australian rules footballers from Victoria (Australia)